Memory is a South Korean television series starring Lee Sung-min, Kim Ji-soo and Park Jin-hee. It replaced Signal and aired on cable network tvN on Fridays and Saturdays at 20:30 (KST) from March 18, 2016 to May 7, 2016 for 16 episodes.

Plot 
The drama depicts a man's vigorous efforts to protect the precious value of the life and family love, as his memory starts fading away.

Cast

Main cast 
 Lee Sung-min as Park Tae-suk
 Kim Ji-soo as Seo Young-joo
 Park Jin-hee as Na Eun-sun

Supporting cast 
 Ban Hyo-jung as Kim Soon-hee 
 Jang Gwang as Park Chul-min
 Park Joon-geum as Jang Mi-rim
 Nam Da-reum as Park Jung-woo
 Kang Ji-woo as Park Yeon-woo
 Lee Jun-ho as Jung Jin
 Yoon So-hee as Bong Sun-hwa
 Jeon No-min as Lee Chan-moo
 Moon Sook as Hwang Tae-sun
 Song Sam-dong as Kim Je-hoon
 Song Seon-mi as Han Jung-won
 Lee Ki-woo as Shin Young-jin
 Heo Jung-do as Kang Yoo-bin
 Park Min-jung as Policewoman Choi
 Yeo Hoe-hyun as  Lee Seung-ho
 Choi Deok-moon as Joo Jae-min
 Kim Min-sang as Joo Sang-pil
 Yoon Kyung-ho as Kim Chang-soo
 Lee Jung-gil as Shin Hwa-sik
 Park Joo-hyung as Cha Won-suk
 Seo In-sung as Park Dong-woo
 Jung Young-gi as Kwon Myung-soo
 Ham Sung-min as Kwon Myung-soo (young)
 Song Ji-in as Yoon Sun-hee
 Jeon Jin-gi as Chairman Lee
 Choi Min-young as Kim Myung-soo
 Son Sung-chan as Kim Myung-soo's father 
 Kim So-yeon as Kim Soo-ji
 Han Seo-jin as Kwon Mi-joo
 Lee Hee-jin as Do In-kyung
 Shin Jae-ha as Kang Hyun-wook
 Kan Mi-youn as Shin Young-jin's ex-lover
 Yoon Ji-on as Assistant director
 Song Ji-ho as Chun Min-gyoo
 Kang Shin-il as Kim Sun-ho (guest)

Original soundtrack

Ratings
In this table,  represent the lowest ratings and  represent the highest ratings.

Awards and nominations

References

External links
 

Memory at Daum 

2016 South Korean television series debuts
TVN (South Korean TV channel) television dramas
Fiction about memory
2016 South Korean television series endings
South Korean melodrama television series
South Korean television series remade in other languages